Kayala Airline was  an airline based in Jeddah, Saudi Arabia. Kayala was a privately owned premium class airline operating domestic and international scheduled as well as charter services. Its main base was King Abdulaziz International Airport, Jeddah, with a further base at King Khalid International Airport, Riyadh.

History
The airline started operations on 16 July 2005 and was wholly owned by Saudi aviation company National Air Services. Until 6 May 2008, the airline was known as Al-Khayala. On 1 April 2009, bankruptcy was declared and all operations were ceased.

Destinations 

As of May 2008, the following destinations were served:

Saudi Arabia
Jeddah (King Abdulaziz International Airport)
Riyadh (King Khalid International Airport)
United Arab Emirates
Dubai (Dubai International Airport)

Fleet
The Kayala Airline fleet consisted of the following aircraft (as of February 2008), which all were operated by National Air Services:

3 Airbus A319-100
1 Airbus A320-200

External links
Official website

References

2009 disestablishments in Saudi Arabia
Airlines established in 2005
Airlines disestablished in 2009
Defunct airlines of Saudi Arabia
Saudi Arabian companies established in 2005